Łukasz Gierak (born 22 June 1988) is a Polish handball player for TuS Nettelstedt-Lübbecke and the Polish national team.

He participated at the 2016 Summer Olympics in Rio de Janeiro, in the men's handball tournament and at the 2017 World Men's Handball Championship.

References

External links 
 
 
 
 

1988 births
Living people
People from Wągrowiec
Sportspeople from Greater Poland Voivodeship
Polish male handball players
Olympic handball players of Poland
Handball players at the 2016 Summer Olympics
Expatriate handball players
Polish expatriate sportspeople in Germany
Handball-Bundesliga players
TuS Nettelstedt-Lübbecke players
21st-century Polish people